The Trenčín Synagogue is a building in the city of Trenčín in Slovakia.

History 

The Jewish population of the city was around 2000 members.
In 1913, the Jewish community built the building on the site of a previous wooden synagogue from 1781.

In 1941, it was damaged by the Slovak Hlinka Guard.

After the war, the building became property of the state and was used as a storage facility. Jews from the city prayed in a room nearby.
It was renovated at the end of the 70's and is now a cultural center.

Images

See also 
 History of the Jews in Slovakia

References

Synagogues in Slovakia
Buildings and structures in Trenčín
Jewish Slovak history
20th-century architecture in Slovakia 
Neolog Judaism synagogues